Whatever is the second studio album by Green Velvet. It was originally released on Relief Records in 2001.

Critical reception

At Metacritic, which assigns a weighted average score out of 100 to reviews from mainstream critics, the album received an average score of 80, based on 6 reviews, indicating "generally favorable reviews".

Track listing

Personnel
Credits adapted from the original CD edition's liner notes.

 Green Velvet – vocals, performance, production, artwork, design
 Curan Stone – additional background vocals (2, 9)
 Walter Phillips – additional background vocals (2, 10)
 Hugo Moya – additional background vocals (10)
 Christopher Nazuka – additional background vocals (10)
 Larry Sturm – engineering
 Vandy Christie – engineering
 Bryon Rickerson – engineering assistance
 Chris Morales – engineering assistance
 Lane Wintz – engineering assistance
 Collin Jordan – mastering
 Brendan J. Gleeson – artwork, design
 Rob Pivato – photography
 Karen Chesley – photography
 Michael Voltattorni – photography

Charts

References

External links
 

2001 albums
Green Velvet albums